Mas Blau is a Barcelona Metro station, located in the El Prat de Llobregat municipality, in the Metropolitan area of Barcelona. The station is served by line L9.

The station is located at the Mas Blau industrial park, which serves logistical, automotive and technological enterprises. Its only entrance is by the Carrer Alta Ribagorça, which serves an underground ticket hall.

The station was opened in 2016, when line L9 was extended from Zona Universitaria station to Aeroport T1 station.

References

External links

Trenscat.com

Barcelona Metro line 9 stations
Railway stations in Spain opened in 2016